is a Japanese game director, the previous Luminous Productions COO and Head of Studio who formerly worked for Square Enix and currently the CEO of JP Games. 

He was the Head of Square Enix's Business Division 2 and part of the Final Fantasy Committee that is tasked with keeping the franchise's releases and content consistent.

Tabata resigned from Luminous Productions and Square Enix Group on October 31, 2018.

Career
When Tabata was in Middle school, he played a historical role-playing game made by Koei and first imagined how much fun it would be to make his own game. In his last year of university, he applied for jobs in the video game industry and in other media arts such as documentaries, television and film. He worked at several different video game publishers prior to his being hired at Square Enix, which he said gave him experience making action games, arcade games, and role-playing games. On November 7, 2018 it was announced that he has departed from Square Enix.

Square Enix
In the aftermath of the 2011 Tohoku earthquake, the international outpouring of support for Japan was paralleled at Square Enix by fan letters about the upcoming release of Type-0, and encouraged Tabata to make something special for the fans and those living through difficult times.

He became the director of Final Fantasy XV, taking over from Tetsuya Nomura in December 2013, a change that was announced in September 2014. He used to be co-director on the project. During his work on Final Fantasy XV, Tabata joked about his busy schedule, mentioning he regularly got only three hours sleep. Tabata, whose previous experience was with portable gaming devices, stated he is excited to work on console systems and "help players dive even deeper into their experiences".

Tabata formerly served as producer for Final Fantasy XV downloadable content. His work on the downloadable content was planned to continue into 2019. He and staff within Square Enix Business Division 2 were also working on a new intellectual property targeting the next-generation of consoles. Development for this project began in earnest in 2018, after previously only having a small team of 20-30 people assigned to it.

On March 27, 2018, it was revealed that Tabata created a new Tokyo game studio for Square Enix called Luminous Productions, which consists of several key members from the Final Fantasy XV team. He was the COO and Head of Studio for Luminous Productions.

On November 7, 2018, Square Enix announced Tabata's resignation from Luminous Productions and Square Enix Group on October 31, 2018. In addition, 3 of the 4 DLCs for Final Fantasy XV were cancelled.

JP Games, Inc.
With the announcement of his resignation from Square Enix, Tabata announced that he will be starting his own company, JP Games, Inc. to launch in January 2019, to create a new project. In June 2021, the company announced The Pegasus Dream Tour, a game themed around the 2020 Summer Paralympics, the first of its kind.

Works

References

External links

1971 births
Square Enix people
Final Fantasy designers
Japanese video game directors
Living people
People from Iwate Prefecture